The World Scrabble Championships are annual or semiannual events in which competitors vie to win Scrabble matches in languages specific to the championship.

These include:
The English World Scrabble Championship which has taken place every two years since 1991
The Spanish World Scrabble Championship which has taken place every year since 1997
The French World Scrabble Championships which have taken place every year since 1972
The Catalan World Scrabble Championship which has taken place every two years since 2005